Nuri (meaning "world" in native Korean), also known as KSLV-II (Korean Space Launch Vehicle-II), is a three-stage launch vehicle, the second one developed by South Korea and the successor to Naro-1 (KSLV-1). Nuri is developed by Korea Aerospace Research Institute (KARI). All three stages use indigenously developed launch vehicle engines, making Nuri the first indigenously developed South Korean orbital launch vehicle (the Naro-1 launch vehicle used a Russian-made first stage). 

The South Korean government has set SpaceX as a "role model", striving to develop relatively cheap and reliable rockets competitive enough for the commercial launch market.

On 21 October 2021, Nuri made its initial orbital launch attempt at 08:00 UTC and it launched a  dummy satellite payload into what was planned to be a  Sun-synchronous orbit (SSO). However, despite the payload reaching the targeted apogee (700 km), the third stage shut down about 46 seconds earlier than planned and the payload did not achieve orbital speed.

Nuri made its second flight on 21 June 2022, 07:00 UTC, with a payload of  including a  dummy satellite payload and a  performance verification satellite (PVSAT) including four cube satellites. The second launch was successful, putting all the satellites onto the  Sun-synchronous orbit (SSO). As a result of this launch, South Korea became the seventh country in the world with the ability to put a satellite weighing a ton and heavier into orbit.

After the two test launches, Nuri showed higher than expected performance, increasing its payload from 1,500 kg (3,300 Ib) to 1,900 kg (4,200 Ib).

Specification 

Nuri (KSLV-II) is a three-stage launch vehicle. The first stage booster uses four KRE-075 SL engines generating 266.4 tons of thrust with a specific impulse of 289.1 seconds. The second stage booster uses a single KRE-075 Vacuum engine, which has a wider nozzle for increased efficiency in vacuum with a specific impulse of 315.4 seconds. The third stage booster uses one KRE-007 engine with a specific impulse of 325.1 seconds. Both engine models use Jet A as fuel and liquid oxygen (LOX) as oxidizer.

Future versions 
There are also plans on making the engine lighter by methods such as removing the pyrotechnic ignitor or limiting its gimbal range. This will allow the payload capacity of the modified KSLV-II to increase from 1.5 tons to 2.8 tons.

Development 

When technology development for Nuri began by October 2010, the overall design goal was to develop a new expendable medium-lift launch vehicle that would be entirely developed with indigenous technology from Korea.  As Nuri first reached orbit in June 2022, the total cost of the development program had been approximately US$1.5 billion.

Engines development 
 In March 2014, the first combustion test of the 7-ton class combustor, was successfully completed, and the total assembly and initial ignition test of the KRE-007 engine started in July 2015. In addition, the first phase of the project was completed with the addition of a three-stage engine combustion test facility and a combustor combustion test facility. However, the problem of combustion instability in the KRE-075 burner required rework.
 Hanwha Techwin Co. signed on 25 January 2016, a 14.1 billion won (US$11.77 million) contract with the Korea Aerospace Research Institute (KARI) to produce both types of liquid propellant rocket engines for Nuri.
 On 8 January 2016, the second phase of the project was carried out to overcome the difficulties of combustor combustion instability and welding technology of the liquid engine fuel tank, and a combustion test of the KRE-075 engine for a few seconds was successful.
 On 3 May 2016, the KRE-075 engine underwent a 1.5 second long spark ignition test. It was later fired for 75 seconds on 8 June 2016. Following these successes, on 20 July 2016, at 1:39 pm, the final target combustion time of 145 seconds (147 seconds) was achieved. During the ground test, the engine performed nominally, with all values such as combustion safety and combustion thrust within the expected error range. During an actual launch, the first stage engine is expected to burn for 127 seconds and the second stage engine for 143 seconds.
 Starting from October 2016 to October 2021, there have been over 184 combustion tests of the second prototype KRE-075 engine.

KRE-075 sea level engine 

The KRE-075 engine was developed in April 2016 after the 30 tf engine development program.

KRE-075 vacuum engine

KRE-007 engine

KSLV-II TLV 
The Test Launch Vehicle (TLV) was a single stage launch vehicle (with a planned two stage version), qualifying the performance of the KRE-075 engine which powers the KSLV-II. The main-stage liquid rocket propellant engine was fully gimballed. With the 2nd stage engine installed, the two-stage version of TLV could perform as a small satellite launch vehicle.

2018 flight 

The TLV was launched from the Naro Space Center in Goheung, South Jeolla Province, on 28 November 2018. The main objective of the first suborbital flight was for the single-stage rocket's main engine to burn 140 seconds, reaching a 100 km altitude before splashing down in the sea between Jeju Island and Okinawa Island.

The maiden flight was first delayed from 25 October 2018 for one month, due to abnormal readings detected in the launch vehicle propellant pressurization system. The test flight was then rescheduled for 28 November 2018, at 07:00 UTC (16:00 KST). No payload was to be placed into orbit.

The launch of the TLV while deemed successful with its main engine burning for 151 seconds in a 10-minute flight, was not broadcast live.

As the TLV was meant to serve as a test craft, and as the flight ended in a success, there was not a second TLV launch.

GEO KSLV 
An upgraded variety of KSLV-II for geostationary equatorial orbit is under development. It will cluster four KRE-090 engines in the core stage, with four side boosters equipped with one KRE-090 engine each. The second stage will be powered with a vacuum-optimized variety of the same KRE-090 engine (KRE-090V), and the third stage will implement a newly developed KRE-010V oxidizer-rich staged combustion engine.

Usage 
Nuri will be used in launching several Earth observation satellites, such as KOMPSAT, medium-class satellites and LEO reconnaissance satellites. It is planned to support South Korea's Moon exploration mission to send orbiters and landers. Nuri will be South Korea's first launch vehicle to enter the commercial launch service market. The launch cost is estimated to be around US$30 million, which is cheaper than its Asian counterparts. This will allow for South Korea to provide cheap launch services for Southeast Asia countries.

An improved version of Nuri is expected to launch a Korean lunar lander by 2030.

Launch history

See also 

 KSLV-I
 Naro Space Center
 KARI
 Comparison of orbital launcher families
 Comparison of orbital launch systems
 Comparison of orbital rocket engines

References 

Space launch vehicles of South Korea
2021 in South Korea